General elections were held in Belgium on 17 December 1978. The Christian People's Party emerged as the largest party, with 57 of the 212 seats in the Chamber of Representatives and 29 of the 106 seats in the Senate. Voter turnout was 94.8%. Elections were also held for the nine provincial councils and for the Council of the German Cultural Community.

The snap elections were called after Prime Minister Leo Tindemans resigned over the Egmont pact, which would have transformed Belgium into a federal state. Vlaams Blok participated for the first time, which was formed out of disagreement within the People's Union over concessions in the Egmont pact.

Results

Chamber of Representatives

Senate

References

1978 elections in Belgium
December 1978 events in Europe